Thomas Hagan (born March 16, 1941) is a former member of the Nation of Islam who was convicted for assassinating Malcolm X in 1965. For a while he also went by the name Talmadge X Hayer, and his chosen Islamic name is Mujahid Abdul Halim.

Assassination of Malcolm X
When Malcolm X was shot on February 21, 1965, in the Audubon Ballroom in Washington Heights, Manhattan, New York City, Hagan was shot in the leg by one of Malcolm X's bodyguards while attempting to flee from the building. Hampered by his bullet wound, Hagan was grabbed by several members of the crowd who witnessed the shooting and physically beat him before police officers arrived and arrested Hagan at the scene. He later confessed to the crime but said that Thomas Johnson (Khalil Islam) and Norman 3X Butler (Muhammad Abdul Aziz), two suspects arrested at a later point in time, were not involved in the assassination.

Hagan stated in a 1977 affidavit that he had planned the shooting with four others (Johnson and Butler not being among them) to seek revenge for Malcolm X's public criticism of Elijah Muhammad and the Nation of Islam. He said that one of his accomplices [aka William 25X Bradley] distracted Malcolm X's bodyguards by starting an argument about having been pickpocketed. When the bodyguards moved toward the diversion and away from Malcolm X, a man with a shotgun stepped up to him and shot him in the chest. After that, Hagan himself and another of his accomplices shot several rounds at Malcolm X with semi-automatic handguns.

Later life
Hagan, Butler, and Johnson all received 20-years-to-life sentences in 1966. During his time in jail, Hagan earned bachelor's and master's degrees; he filed 16 times for parole but was denied each time. Butler was paroled in 1985 and Johnson in 1987. From 1988, Hagan was in a work release program, which allowed him to seek work outside the prison. It required him to spend only two days a week in Lincoln Correctional Facility, a minimum-security facility in Manhattan. For the rest of the week, he was allowed to stay with his wife and children. Among other places, he worked at the Crown Heights Youth Collective, as a counselor at a homeless shelter on Wards Island, and in a fast-food restaurant. Hagan was granted parole in March 2010 and was released from prison at the end of April.  

In 2021, Hagan expressed support that the convictions of Thomas Johnson and Norman 3X Butler were overturned, matching his original claims that they were not involved in the murder of Malcolm X.

He is still a practicing Muslim, but has left the Nation of Islam, no longer agreeing with their ideology. He has expressed "regrets and sorrow" for having shot Malcolm X.

References

Further reading
Peter Louis Goldman: The Death and Life of Malcolm X. University of Illinois Press 1979, pp. 273–274

1941 births
Living people
American assassins
American people convicted of murder
African-American Muslims
Converts to Islam
Former Nation of Islam members
Malcolm X
Place of birth missing (living people)
People convicted of murder by New York (state)
People paroled from life sentence
People from Sunset Park, Brooklyn